The 2016–17 Boston Bruins season was the Bruins' 93rd season in the National Hockey League (NHL). After missing the playoffs the past two years, the team returned where they lost to the Ottawa Senators in six games.

Standings

Schedule and results

Pre-season

Regular season

Playoffs

The Bruins clinched the playoffs for the first time since the 2013–14 season. They met the Ottawa Senators in the first round, where they were ultimately defeated in six games.

Player stats
Final Stats

Skaters

Goaltenders

†Denotes player spent time with another team before joining Bruins. Stats reflect time with the Bruins only.
‡Denotes player was traded mid-season. Stats reflect time with the Bruins only.

Awards and honours

Milestones
 On November 22, 2016, the Bruins as a team reached the milestone of 20,000 goals all-time in NHL play, dating back to their 1924-25 debut season with Smokey Harris' goal for the Bruins, as the first NHL goal in team history on December 1, 1924. New forward David Backes' power play goal achieved the 20,000 goal milestone for the Bruins on November 22, in a 4—2 home rink loss to the St. Louis Blues, Backes' former team as the visitors to TD Garden - the 20,000th goal plateau has only been attained by one other NHL team, the Bruins' top rival, the Montreal Canadiens.

Transactions
The Bruins have been involved in the following transactions during the 2016–17 season:

Trades

Free agents acquired

Free agents lost

Claimed via waivers

Lost via waivers

Player signings

Draft picks

Below are the Boston Bruins' selections at the 2016 NHL Entry Draft, to be held on June 24–25, 2016 at the First Niagara Center in Buffalo, New York.

Notes

 The San Jose Sharks' first-round pick went to the Boston Bruins as the result of a trade on June 30, 2015 that sent Martin Jones to San Jose in exchange for Sean Kuraly and this pick.
 The Boston Bruins' second-round pick went to the Tampa Bay Lightning as the result of a trade on March 2, 2015 that sent Brett Connolly to Boston in exchange for a second-round pick in 2015 and this pick.
 The New York Islanders' second-round pick went to the Boston Bruins as the result of a trade on October 4, 2014 that sent Johnny Boychuk to New York in exchange for Philadelphia's second-round pick in 2015, a conditional third-round pick in 2015 and this pick.
 The Boston Bruins' third-round pick went to the Carolina Hurricanes as the result of a trade on February 29, 2016 that sent John-Michael Liles to Boston in exchange for Anthony Camara, a fifth-round pick in 2017 and this pick.
 The Boston Bruins' fourth-round pick went to the New Jersey Devils as the result of a trade on February 29, 2016 that sent Lee Stempniak to Boston in exchange for a second-round pick in 2017 and this pick.
 The Minnesota Wild's fifth-round pick went to the Boston Bruins as the result of a trade on June 27, 2015 that sent a fifth-round pick in 2015 to Minnesota in exchange for this pick.
 The Boston Bruins' sixth-round pick was re-acquired as the result of a trade on June 25, 2015 that sent Carl Soderberg to Colorado in exchange for this pick.
Colorado previously acquired this pick as the result of a trade on March 2, 2015 that sent Max Talbot and Paul Carey to Boston in exchange for Jordan Caron and this pick.

 The Boston Bruins' seventh-round pick went to the Florida Panthers as the result of a trade on June 25, 2016 that sent a seventh-round pick in 2017 to Boston in exchange for this pick.

References

Boston Bruins seasons
Boston Bruins
Boston Bruins
Boston Bruins
Boston Bruins
Bruins
Bruins